Pachnephorus senegalensis is a species of leaf beetle found in Senegal, Gambia, Guinea Bissau, Mali, Togo,
Benin, Nigeria, Chad, Ethiopia, the Democratic Republic of the Congo, Tanzania and Zambia, described by Julien Achard in 1914.

References

Eumolpinae
Beetles of the Democratic Republic of the Congo
Insects of West Africa
Insects of Chad
Insects of Ethiopia
Insects of Tanzania
Insects of Zambia
Beetles described in 1914